is a passenger railway station located in the city of Matsuyama, Ehime Prefecture, Japan. It is operated by the private transportation company Iyotetsu.

Lines
During most of the day, railway trains arrive every fifteen minutes. Trains continue from Matsuyama City Station on the Yokogawara Line to Yokogawara Station.

Layout
Nishi-Kinuyama Station is an above-ground station with two opposed side platforms and two tracks, and is unmanned except during rush hours.  It is also the only station on the Takahama Line that does not have toilet facilities.

History
Nishi-Kinuyama Station was opened on 10 June 1968.

Surrounding area
The station is located in a residential area

See also
 List of railway stations in Japan

References

External links

Iyotetsu Station Information

Iyotetsu Takahama Line
Railway stations in Ehime Prefecture
Railway stations in Japan opened in 1968
Railway stations in Matsuyama, Ehime